The Evergreen B class is a series of 20 container ships built for Evergreen Marine. The Ships were built by CSBC Corporation in Taiwan and Imabari Shipbuilding in Japan. The ships have a maximum theoretical capacity of around 2,800 twenty-foot equivalent units (TEU).

List of ships 

The ship flag of Odd number is Panama. Owner is GreenCompass Marine S.A. In addition the ship flag of Even number is Taiwan. Owner is Evergreen Marine Corp. (Taiwan) Ltd.

References 

Container ship classes